Sher Bahadur Shah (January 1778 – 25 April 1806) was a Nepalese noble who served as Chautaria from 1794 until his assassination in 1806. He was the son of King Pratapsingh Shah and the 3rd dynasty royal prince of Nepal.

Biography 
Sher Bahadur Shah was born at Hanuman Dhoka on January 1778 to King Pratap Singh Shah and Maiju Rani Maneshvari Devi. His mother was from a Newar family and the concubine of the king.

Shah was promoted to Chautaria in 1794 by Rana Bahadur Shah.

There was a conspiracy led by Prince Bahadur Shah, son of Prithvi Narayan Shah, to depose then king Rana Bahadur Shah and install Sher Bahadur Shah on the throne.

In 1806, Shah assassinated his step-brother Rana Bahadur Shah, which ultimately led to the 1806 Bhandarkhal massacre.

Sher Bahadur Shah was assassinated by Bal Narsingh Kunwar on 25 April 1806.

References 

1778 births
1806 deaths
18th-century Nepalese nobility
18th-century Nepalese people
Assassinated Nepalese politicians
Nepalese Hindus
People from Kathmandu
People murdered in Nepal
People of the Nepalese unification
Shah dynasty
Nepalese princes